List of the National Register of Historic Places listings in Putnam County, New York

This is intended to be a complete list of properties and districts listed on the National Register of Historic Places in Putnam County, New York.  The locations of National Register properties and districts (at least for all showing latitude and longitude coordinates below) may be seen in a map by clicking on "Map of all coordinates". Two properties are further designated as National Historic Landmarks of the United States.



Listings county-wide

|}

See also

National Register of Historic Places listings in New York

References

Putnam County